Yao Gomado (born 20 October 1966) is a Ghanaian politician and member of the Seventh Parliament of the Fourth Republic of Ghana representing the Akan Constituency in the Oti Region on the ticket of the National Democratic Congress.

Early life and education 
Gomado was born and hails from Dodo-Dompa in the Oti Region of Ghana. Yao Gomado passed his Common Entrance Examination in 1978 which enabled him to obtain his Ordinary Level and Advanced Level. He then proceeded to have his Electrical Engineering Practice in 1982, C&G Institute London, Part Two Electricals (Electrical Engineering Technician) in 1983, Class Two Marine Electrical Engineer (Marine Electrical and Automation Engineering) in 1987, Class Three Marine Engineer (Shipboard Marine Engineering Practitioner) in 2012, Converteam A Series Maintenance (Dynamic Position Maintenance) in 2013, Dynamic Positioning (Ship Dynamic Positioning Maintenance) in 2013, Shipboard Dynamic Position (Dynamic Position Maintenance) in 2013, Professional Development Certificate (Project Management) in 2014, Marine Surveyor (Hull & Machinery) (Shipboard Marine Surveyor) in 2015, Mini-MBA (Corporate Governance) in 2015, Class One Electro Technical (Marine Electro-Technical Engineering) in 2016, Corporate Member (Engineering Practitioner) in 2017, Shipboard Internal Auditor (ISM-ISPS-MLC) in 2018 at Regional Maritime Academy and Post Graduate Diploma (Strategic Management) in 2019 at Regional Maritime University.

Career 
Gomado worked at Volta Lake Transport Company Limited, Akosombo, Ghana as the Assistant Electrical Engineer during his National Service period. He worked with Neptune Ship Management PTE Ltd in Singapore as a Junior Marine Electrical Engineer. He again served as the Marine Electrical Engineer of PSM Perkapalan SDN BHD in Malaysia. Yao Gomado also worked with the Paccship Management PTE in Singapore as the Marine Electrical Engineer. He finally worked with the Oceanwave Maritime & Engineering Consultancy Limited as their technical director.

Political life 
Gomado contested and won the NDC parliamentary primaries for Akan Constituency in the Oti Region of Ghana. Gomado won in the 2020 Ghanaian general elections on the ticket of the National Democratic Congress with 19,317 votes (58.69%) against Alhaji Rashid Bawa of the New Patriotic Party who had 13,300 votes (40.41%) to join the 8th Parliament of the Fourth Republic of Ghana.

Gomado refused the use of the government assigned Toyota V8 to provide water for his constituency. He again mortgaged his four-year salary to get grader for road repairs in his Akan Constituency. Gomado also assured and promised to improve standard of education in his constituency.

Committees 
Gomado is a member of the Judiciary Committee. He is also a member of the Environment, Science and Technology Committee of the Eighth (8th) Parliament of the Fourth Republic of Ghana.

Personal life 
Gomado is a Christian. He is fluent in speaking Ewe and English.

References 

1966 births
Living people